Mount Olive is a NJ Transit station in Mount Olive, New Jersey, located in the International Trade Center. The station, located on the side of Waterloo Village Road, services trains for both the Montclair-Boonton Line and the Morristown Line along trackage owned by Norfolk Southern. The line is not electrified from Hackettstown to Dover, where passengers can transfer to an electric Morristown Line train via Summit or a diesel Montclair-Boonton train via Wayne and Montclair. Trains along both lines head to Hoboken Terminal in Hoboken, New Jersey or New York Penn Station at 34th Street in New York City, although Montclair-Boonton trains require a transfer at Montclair State University or Newark Broad Street for electrified service to New York. It is also the least-used station in the NJ Transit commuter rail network.

History 

After the termination of Boonton Line passenger service to Washington in 1966, service terminated at Netcong station in Netcong. In 1994, stations were constructed along Norfolk Southern's Washington Secondary (to Washington) at Mount Olive and Hackettstown, extending the line into Warren County and providing rail service to the International Trade Center (ITC) along with tourist attraction, Waterloo Village. Service took effect on November 5, 1994 from Netcong to Hackettstown. The Washington Secondary was the original alignment of the Delaware, Lackawanna and Western Railroad's Main Line via Washington and Portland, Pennsylvania. Near Mount Olive station was once the Waterloo station, named after local Waterloo, New Jersey. Waterloo station was first built in 1854 and remained in service until being torn down in the 1920s. It continued to receive passengers, and was the only regular stop with neither a building nor even a shelter.

Station layout
Mount Olive has one track and one mini-high side platform.

See also 
Sussex Railroad

Bibliography

References

External links 

Mount Olive Township, New Jersey
NJ Transit Rail Operations stations
Railway stations in the United States opened in 1854
Former Delaware, Lackawanna and Western Railroad stations
1854 establishments in New Jersey